Courpière (Auvergnat: Corpèira) is a commune in the Puy-de-Dôme department in Auvergne-Rhône-Alpes in central France.

Population

Tour de France cycle race 

Courpiere was on the stage 14 route of the 2020 Tour de France

See also
Communes of the Puy-de-Dôme department

References

Communes of Puy-de-Dôme
Auvergne